Laufenberg is a surname. Notable people with the surname include:

Babe Laufenberg, American football player
Gene Laufenberg, American television writer and producer
Heinrich Laufenberg, German communist
Nolan Laufenberg (born 1999), American football player
Uwe Eric Laufenberg, German actor

See also
 Laufenburg (disambiguation)